La Forêt-du-Temple (literally The Forest of the Temple) is a commune in the Creuse department in the Nouvelle-Aquitaine region in central France.

Geography

Population

Sights
 The church of Notre-Dame, dating from the twelfth century.
 A war memorial, including the name of a woman who died of grief after her three sons were killed in World War I.

See also
Communes of the Creuse department

References

Communes of Creuse